First Stripes is a Canadian documentary film, directed by Jean-François Caissy and released in 2018. The film profiles a group of Canadian Armed Forces recruits  commencing basic training.

The film had its world premiere at the 2018 Berlin International Film Festival, and its Canadian premiere at the 2018 Hot Docs Canadian International Documentary Festival.

Nicolas Canniccioni received a Canadian Screen Award nomination for Best Cinematography in a Documentary at the 7th Canadian Screen Awards.

References

External links
 

2018 films
Canadian documentary films
National Film Board of Canada documentaries
French-language Canadian films
2010s Canadian films